Free Media is a media publishing company based in Casablanca, Morocco.

Magazines
 Nichane - in 
 Tel Quel - in 

Mass media companies of Morocco
Mass media in Casablanca